Breitenberg may refer to:

Places
 Breitenberg, Lower Bavaria
 Breitenberg, Schleswig-Holstein

Mountains
Breitenberg (Allgäu Alps)
Breitenberg (Haardt)
Breitenberg (Tannheimer Berge)